Robert Ballard "Bob" Bailey (August 7, 1892 – December 23, 1957) was a lawyer and Democratic politician from Russellville, Arkansas. Winning a seat in the Arkansas Senate in 1923, he represented the Fourth District (Johnson and Pope counties) for eight of the next twelve years. Following ten years in private practice, Bailey was elected Lieutenant Governor of Arkansas in 1936, serving three two-year terms. As lieutenant governor, Bailey often served as acting governor when the governor was out of state.

Early life and career

Political career
Bailey served as lieutenant governor under Carl E. Bailey as well as Governor Homer M. Adkins' first lieutenant governor.

References 

 

1892 births
1957 deaths
Democratic Party Arkansas state senators
People from Russellville, Arkansas
Lieutenant Governors of Arkansas
20th-century American politicians